Colonel Dhani Ram Shandil (Retd.) (born 20 October 1940) is an Indian politician from Himachal Pradesh. He is a member of the Indian National Congress political party.

Dhani Ram Shandil has served elite Dogra Regiment of Indian Army and is Bharat jyoti award winner. Shandil belongs to the Koli caste of Himachal Pradesh.

Political Career
In 1999, he was elected to the 13th Lok Sabha from Shimla constituency in Himachal Pradesh as a Himachal Vikas Congress candidate. He was re-elected to the 14th Lok Sabha in 2004 from the same constituency as an Indian National Congress candidate. He is the MLA from Solan and previously served as Social Justice and empowerment minister in the Himachal Pradesh Cabinet.

Posts held 
 1999, Elected to 13th Lok Sabha
 Leader, Himachal Vikas Congress Parliamentary Party, Lok Sabha
 1999-2000 Member, Committee on Defence
 2000-2001 Member, Library Committee
 2000-2004 Member, Consultative Committee, Ministry of Petroleum and Natural Gas
 2004 Re-elected to 14th Lok Sabha (2nd term)
 Member, Committee on Provision of Computer for MPs, Offices of Parties in Lok Sabha and Officers of Lok Sabha Secretariat
 Member, Committee on External Affairs
 Member, Committee on the Welfare of Scheduled Castes and Scheduled Tribes
 5 Aug. 2007 onwards,	Member, Standing Committee on External Affairs

References

External links
 Official biographical sketch in Parliament of India website

1940 births
Living people
Lok Sabha members from Himachal Pradesh
Indian National Congress politicians from Himachal Pradesh
India MPs 2004–2009
People from Shimla
India MPs 1999–2004
People from Solan
Himachal Pradesh MLAs 2012–2017
Himachal Pradesh MLAs 2017–2022